South Carolina Highway 417 (SC 417) is a  state highway in central Greenville and Spartanburg counties in the northwestern part of the U.S. state of South Carolina.

Route description
SC 417's western terminus is at junction with U.S. Route 276 (US 276) in Mauldin and near the junctions of Interstate 385 (I-385) and I-185. Its overall course is in a northeasterly direction, and SC 417's eastern terminus is at a junction with SC 296 near Spartanburg.

From SC 417's western terminus to its split from SC 14, SC 417 is known as Main Street and Laurens Road. From then until its merger with SC 146, SC 417 is known as Lee Vaughn Road. While it is merged with SC 146, SC 417 is known as Woodruff Road. When it splits from SC 146, SC 417 is known only as Highway 417, and it keeps that name until it reaches its eastern terminus.

Major intersections

See also

References

External links

SC 417 at Virginia Highways' South Carolina Highways Annex

Transportation in Greenville County, South Carolina
Transportation in Spartanburg County, South Carolina
417